The Sound of Night is an outdoor 1986 bronze sculpture by Italian artist Mimmo Paladino, installed at the Museum of Fine Arts, Houston's (MFAH) Lillie and Hugh Roy Cullen Sculpture Garden, in the U.S. state of Texas. According to MFAH, the work illustrates the artist's "[revisit to] the disquieting sensibility of Breton and his contemporaries, tapping into both cultural archetypes and the language of dreams " It was donated to the museum by Alice and Timothy Sharma.

See also
 1986 in art
 List of public art in Houston

References

1986 establishments in Texas
1986 sculptures
Bronze sculptures in Texas
Lillie and Hugh Roy Cullen Sculpture Garden
Works by Italian people